On Wings of Eagles (also titled The Last Race) is a Chinese-Hong Kong-American historical sports drama film directed by Stephen Shin and Michael Parker and starring Joseph Fiennes and Shawn Dou.  It is an unofficial sequel to Chariots of Fire  (1981).

Cast
Joseph Fiennes as Eric Liddell
Shawn Dou as Xu Niu
Elizabeth Arends as Florence Liddell
Richard Sanderson as Dr. Hubbard
Jesse Kove as Hugh Johnson
Augusta Xu-Holland as Catherine Standish

References

External links
 
 

Chinese drama films
Hong Kong drama films
Films set in the 20th century
American sports drama films
American historical drama films
English-language Chinese films
English-language Hong Kong films
2010s Japanese-language films
2010s English-language films
2010s Mandarin-language films
2010s American films
2010s Hong Kong films